HMAS Success was an Admiralty  destroyer of the Royal Australian Navy (RAN). Built for the Royal Navy during World War I, the ship was not completed until 1919, and spent less than eight months in British service before being transferred to the RAN at the start of 1920. The destroyer's career was uneventful, with almost all of it spent in Australian waters. Success was decommissioned in 1930, and was sold for ship breaking in 1937.

Design and construction

Success was built to the Admiralty design of the S-class destroyer, which was designed and built as part of the British emergency war programme. The propulsion machinery consisted of three Yarrow boilers feeding Brown-Curtis turbines, which supplied  to the ship's two propeller shafts. The ship's company was made up of 6 officers and 93 sailors.

The destroyer's primary armament consisted of three QF 4-inch Mark IV guns. These were supplemented by a 2-pounder pom-pom, two 9.5-inch howitzer bomb throwers, five .303 inch machine guns (a mix of Lewis and Maxim guns), two twin 21-inch torpedo tube sets, two depth charge throwers, and two depth charge chutes.

Success was laid down by William Doxford and Sons Limited at their Sunderland shipyard in 1917. The destroyer was launched on 29 June 1918, and completed on 15 April 1919. The ship was briefly commissioned into the Royal Navy in April 1919, but was quickly marked for transfer to the RAN, along with four sister ships. Success was commissioned into the RAN on 27 January 1920.

Operational history

Success and three of her sister ships sailed for Australia on 20 February, visiting ports in the Mediterranean, India, Singapore, and the Netherlands East Indies before reaching Sydney on 29 April. Success operated in Australian waters until 6 October 1921, when she was placed in reserve. The destroyer was reactivated on 1 December 1925. In late May 1926, Success visited Port Moresby.

Decommissioning and fate
Success paid off on 21 May 1930. She was sold to Penguins Limited for ship breaking in 1937.

Citations

References

S-class destroyers (1917) of the Royal Australian Navy
Ships built on the River Wear
1918 ships